The Winslow Unified School District is the school district for Winslow, Arizona. It includes three elementary schools (Washington, Jefferson, and Bonnie Brennan); a junior high school; and Winslow High School. The superintendent is Connie Gover.

The district includes Winslow, Winslow West, and a portion of Seba Dalkai.

References

External links
 

School districts in Navajo County, Arizona
Winslow, Arizona
Education on the Navajo Nation